John Edward Hickman (March 28, 1883 – April 26, 1962) was a justice of the Supreme Court of Texas from 1945 to 1948, and chief justice from 1948 to 1961.

References

Justices of the Texas Supreme Court
1883 births
1962 deaths
20th-century American judges